Neil Clarkson Johnson (born 24 January 1970) is a former Zimbabwean international cricketer who played 13 Test matches and 48 One Day Internationals between 1998 and 2000. An all-rounder, he bowled right-arm fast-medium and played in the middle order in test matches as an aggressive left-handed batsman. He usually opened the batting in one-day cricket.

Despite making sporadic appearances for Zimbabwe at international level, he made substantial contributions with both bat and ball in the crucial crunch match situations. He has often bailed out Zimbabwe from precarious situations to match winning positions with this all-round display. In his brief international career, he made an impact as an aggressive opening batsman and also as an attacking fast bowler. He was an integral member of arguably Zimbabwe's best ODI side during the late 1990s. His career was cut short due to internal politics of Zimbabwe cricket. He retired from all forms of cricket in 2004 at the age of 34.

Domestic career
Johnson was born in Salisbury – now Harare. Throughout his first-class career he spent time in both South Africa and England, playing for Boland, Eastern Province, Natal, Western Province, Leicestershire and Hampshire. He played most of his first-class cricket in South Africa. Despite having lot of experience having played in South African domestic competition, he was never really in the contention to make into the South African national cricket team in the 1990s due to the abundance of all-rounders in the South African set-up. His county stint with Leicestershire in 1997 proved his worth as a capable all-rounder and was largely unknown in cricketing circles until making his county debut.

Early years 
His father was a farmer in the Umvukwes – now Mvurwi district in the north of Mashonaland. He pursued his primary education initially at the Umvukwes Primary School, a school where he rose to prominence at the tender age of seven after winning a selection for the school's colts’ team in the under 11 age category. During when Zimbabwe gained its independence from Great Britain in 1980, his father was offered a job as a farming consultant at Howick in Natal which his father accepted.

South Africa 
Neil along with his family members emigrated to South Arica when he was just ten years old. He then pursued his primary education at Howick High and rose through the ranks as a young schoolboy cricketer firstly with the Natal Under 12 team for junior school players and then broke into Natal B team for under-18 players. He then made a move to Grahamstown to pursue his studies at Kingswood College and opened the bowling alongside Brett Schultz for the Eastern Province schools. He later broke into full South Africa Schools team in 1988.

He scored few centuries at high school with the first century coming at the age of 15. His father made a significant influence in his cricketing process and even took him to attend net practice sessions. His father allowed Neil to let him have his own technique and natural way of playing but his technique was fine-tuned as a teenager by Chris Stone who was an English professional coach in South Africa. His talent was later spotted and identified by former dual international Kepler Wessels and Wessels helped Neil to win a bursary to the University of Port Elizabeth. At the University of Port Elizabeth, he pursued his BA degree in the field of Industrial Psychology. He also went onto play for University of Port Elizabeth's first XI and Eastern Province B side. He also made few appearances for full Eastern Province team in Benson and Hedges Night Series Trophy – now Momentum One Day Cup. After the four years at the university, he was awarded a lucrative attractive professional cricket contract with Natal and he agreed without any hesitation. He often acknowledged the patronage under Wessels stating that his assistance helped him to work on his way to top-flight cricket.

He considered Natal as his adopted home as he played most of his school and domestic cricket in Natal. He made his first-class debut in the 1989–90 season in the Castle Bowl competition playing for Eastern Province B against Natal B side. He had a breakthrough 1993–94 season for Natal where his all-round performance against Border including a century and five wicket-haul in an innings helped him to secure a place in South Africa A lineup in the tour of Zimbabwe in 1994–95. He was then approached by Denis Streak who served in Zimbabwe Cricket Union who requested and suggested him to consider returning to Zimbabwe with a view to play international cricket for Zimbabwe. He was however, could not commit himself immediately upon his suggestion due to his impending marriage.

Returning to Zimbabwe 
After a year or two of rumours, he became another of Zimbabwe's returning exiles following in the footsteps of Murray Goodwin and Adam Huckle. He arrived back in Harare in around early September 1998 from Natal with the intention to represent his country of birth; Zimbabwe at international level. He was in touch with former Zimbabwean player Andy Pycroft who was then serving in the Zimbabwe Cricket Union and Andy made arrangements to fit in Neil to feature in Zimbabwe colours. Neil missed out on playing in the bilateral home ODI series against India in October 1998 due to delay in his passport clearance but his much-anticipated passport was granted and Zimbabwean citizenship was restored by the authorities just 48 hours prior to the start of the one-off test match at Harare. He broke into the test squad as selectors deliberately kept their options wide open.

International career
He made his test debut against India on 7 October 1998 at Harare. Despite not making any significant contributions with the bat on debut, he dismissed Sachin Tendulkar in both the innings of the match. Zimbabwe went onto register a historic 73 run victory after bowling out India cheaply for 173 runs.

He was subsequently picked in Zimbabwe's squad for the 1998 ICC KnockOut Trophy which was also the inaugural edition of the ICC Champions Trophy. He made his ODI debut during the tournament in the preliminary round match against New Zealand in a thrilling contest where New Zealand secured a last ball victory chasing 259 and as a result Zimbabwe failed to qualify for the quarter-final of the tournament. Chris Harris took the game away from Zimbabwe by scoring an unbeaten quickfire 37 off just 21 deliveries especially pouncing on the inexperienced Neil Johnson's final set of overs to secure a nail-biting win in order to qualify for the main draw of the tournament.

In November 1998, only into his second test match he went onto score a career defining century, incidentally his maiden test century against Pakistan at Peshawar which also helped Zimbabwe to secure a historic first ever test win against Pakistan in Pakistan. Zimbabwe went onto eventually win the three match series 1–0 with second test match ending in a draw and third was abandoned without a ball being bowled. It also marked Zimbabwe's first ever test series win in Pakistan soil.

1999 World Cup campaign 

A year after a disappointing KnockOut Trophy, Johnson made a name for himself during the 1999 Cricket World Cup campaign and ended the tournament on a high as the leading run-scorer as well as leading wicket-taker for Zimbabwe during the course of the tournament. He scored 367 runs at a remarkable average of 52.42 and took 12 wickets at an average of 19.41 in across eight matches of the tournament. His tally of 367 runs in the 1999 World Cup stood out as the most runs scored by a Zimbabwean in a single edition of the World Cup for about 16 years before his record was surpassed by Brendan Taylor during the 2015 Cricket World Cup. Johnson is also notable for having opened both the batting and bowling for Zimbabwe in the 1999 World Cup tournament.

Johnson was also influential in Zimbabwe's qualification to the Super Six stage of the 1999 World Cup. He won three Man-of-the-Match awards in the tournament. One of those awards came in his side's surprise victory over eventual semi-finalists South Africa. He engineered Zimbabwe's epic win of the tournament against South Africa with an all-round display. Opening the batting, he top-scored with 76 before dismissing Gary Kirsten with the first ball of the South African chase. He then got rid of Jacques Kallis for a duck and finished with 3 for 27. South Africa's upset loss against Zimbabwe also effectively dented South Africa's hopes of making into the 1999 Cricket World Cup Final.

In the same tournament, he made an unbeaten 132 and took 2/43 against eventual champions Australia at Lord's in a losing cause.  In his breath-taking knock of 132, he piled up misery in one of Shane Warne’s quota of overs by smacking him for four boundaries. He also added 114 runs for the second wicket with Murray Goodwin in the match against Australia during the 1999 World Cup campaign and it is also the highest second highest second wicket partnership for Zimbabwe in World Cups.

Post 1999 World Cup and retirement 
He played a crucial role in Zimbabwe's triumph in the Meril International Tournament 1998–99 where Zimbabwe defeated Kenya in the final. On 21 October 1999 during the third ODI against Australia at Bulawayo, he became the fastest Zimbabwean batsman to score 1000 runs in ODIs in just 28 innings. He top-scored for Zimbabwe with 110 during that match but he ran out of partners on the other end which resulted in a 83 run defeat for Zimbabwe.

During the first of the three match test series against Sri Lanka at Harare in 1999-2000, Neil bravely took on Muttiah Muralitharan who was regarded as one of the best off-spinners of that era. Neil even smashed four boundaries in a single over in the first test and he was the only other player in the Zimbabwean side except Andy Flower to take charge on Muralitharan.

After the Zimbabwe's tour of England in 2000, he left Zimbabwe to join Western Province of South Africa to play in the Supersport Series and ZCU confirmed that it would not renew the contract with him following his unceremonious departure. He departed due to the disputes over his payment from the Zimbabwe Cricket Union. He also endured difficult strained relationship which led to creative differences with the then head coach of Zimbabwe David Houghton forced him to move back to South Africa two years after making his international debut for Zimbabwe. He and his teammate Murray Goodwin's unceremonious exits from Zimbabwe cricket earmarked the beginning of Zimbabwe's slide in the 2000s.

County cricket 
He spent one year at Leicestershire County Club as their overseas player. He made an imminent impact in his first year in county cricket in 1997 as he ended up his debut season piling up 819 runs at a stellar average of 63 in 12 matches including two centuries. He alsoended up as the top runscorer for Leicestershire in 1997 English cricket season. He also played in the Lancashire League for two seasons and also had two season stint with North Yorkshire and South Durham Cricket League.

In 2001, he returned to county cricket in England as he was signed up by Hampshire for the 2001 county season but his nagging injury stopped him from bowling very often. He scored a century against Durham in the 2001 Cheltenham & Gloucester Trophy on his return to county cricket. He was offered a further one-year contract with the club for 2002. He was a regular member of the Hampshire county team until the end of 2002 season.

Coaching career 
In 2010, bizarre reports mysteriously appeared in online citing that Johnson is set to be appointed as the young yoga instructor of Indian national cricket team by the Board of Cricket Control in India during the test tour of South Africa especially after India's tough loss at Centurion. It was believed that the then head coach of India, Gary Kirsten wanted him to be roped into the board to keep the players in a state of relaxation. However, the reports were deemed as false and misleading with Johnson himself claiming that he had never had the practice of doing yoga. It was later revealed that Cape Town based Australian yoga guru Jim Harrington was appointed as yoga instructor.

He also served as head of cricket at Hilton College School in South Africa and also personally coached South African seamer Lungi Ngidi.

References

External links 
 

1970 births
Living people
Cricketers from Harare
White Zimbabwean sportspeople
Zimbabwean cricketers
Zimbabwe Test cricketers
Zimbabwe One Day International cricketers
Cricketers at the 1999 Cricket World Cup
Eastern Province cricketers
Hampshire cricketers
Ireland cricketers
Leicestershire cricketers
Matabeleland cricketers
KwaZulu-Natal cricketers
Western Province cricketers
Marylebone Cricket Club cricketers
Alumni of Hilton College (South Africa)